A vigilante is a person who enforces the law without legal authority to do so.

Vigilante may also refer to:

People
 John Vigilante (born 1985), American ice hockey player
 Konni Zilliacus (1894–1967), UK Labour Party politician who used the pen name Vigilantes
 José Estrada Jr., pro-wrestler who used the ringname "El Vigilante"

Fictional characters
 Vigilante (Arrowverse), a character from the Arrowverse.
 Vigilante (comics), several fictional DC Comics characters

Groups
 The Vigilantes, a syndicate of American writers

Film
 The Vigilante, a 1947 film serial based on the original DC character
 Vigilante (film), a 1982 film directed by William Lustig
 A Vigilante, a 2018 American film

Albums
 Vigilante (Willie Colón and Héctor Lavoe album), or the title song, 1983
 Vigilante (Magnum album), or the title song, 1986

Military
 North American A-5 Vigilante, a US Navy supersonic bomber
 VFA-151, a United States Navy F/A-18E Super Hornet squadron nicknamed the Vigilantes
 T249 Vigilante, a prototype US self-propelled anti-aircraft gun

Other uses
 Vigilante (video game), a 1988 arcade game
 "Vigilante" (Arrow episode), a television episode
 Vigilante (insecticide)
 El Vigilante (sculpture), in Ecatepec, Mexico

See also

 
 
 Vigilant (disambiguation)
 Vigilance (disambiguation)